The Northern Dancer Stakes is a discontinued American Thoroughbred horse race that was held annually in mid-June at Churchill Downs in Louisville, Kentucky. It was last run in 2010 with a purse of $125,000.

Named in honor of the horse Northern Dancer, the Grade III stakes for three-year-olds was run on dirt over a distance of 8.5 furlongs ( miles).

Canadian-bred and owned honoree Northern Dancer (1961–1990) won the 1964 Kentucky Derby in record time on the Churchill Downs track. He went on to win the Preakness Stakes and Queen's Plate. Retired from racing, Northern Dancer became the most important sire and sire of sires in the second half of the 20th century.

Winners

References

Graded stakes races in the United States
Flat horse races for three-year-olds
Churchill Downs horse races
Recurring sporting events established in 2002
2002 establishments in Kentucky